The alpha male in groups of animals is the most dominant male of its social group.

Alpha male may also refer to:

 Alpha and beta male (slang), slang terms for men
 Alpha Male (film), a 2006 American-British drama film
 Alpha Males (TV series), a 2022 Spanish comedy television series
 Team Alpha Male, an American martial arts gym in Sacramento, California
 Monty Brown, a wrestler nicknamed "The Alpha Male"
 Dan Kelly and the Alpha Males, an Australian rock band